Kersa is the name of several places in Ethiopia:
 Kersa, Jimma, a woreda in the Jimma Zone
 Karsa River (also spelled "Kersa"), in western Ethiopia
 Kersa, Arsi, a town in the Arsi Zone
 Kersa, Hararge, a woreda in the Hararge Zone